Activin A receptor, type I (ACVR1) is a protein which in humans is encoded by the ACVR1 gene; also known as ALK-2 (activin receptor-like kinase-2).  ACVR1 has been linked to the 2q23-24 region of the genome. This protein is important in the bone morphogenic protein (BMP) pathway which is responsible for the development and repair of the skeletal system. While knock-out models with this gene are in progress, the ACVR1 gene has been connected to fibrodysplasia ossificans progressiva, a disease characterized by the formation of heterotopic bone throughout the body. It is a bone morphogenetic protein receptor, type 1.

Function 

Activins are dimeric growth and differentiation factors which belong to the transforming growth factor-beta (TGF beta) superfamily of structurally related signaling proteins. Activins signal through a heteromeric complex of receptor serine kinases which include at least two type I ( I and IB) and two type II (II and IIB) receptors. These receptors are all transmembrane proteins, composed of a ligand-binding extracellular domain with cysteine-rich region, a transmembrane domain, and a cytoplasmic domain with predicted serine/threonine specificity. Type I receptors are essential for signaling; and type II receptors are required for binding ligands and for expression of type I receptors. Type I and II receptors form a stable complex after ligand binding, resulting in phosphorylation of type I receptors by type II receptors. This gene encodes activin A type I receptor which signals a particular transcriptional response in concert with activin type II receptors.

Signaling 

ACVR1 transduces signals of BMPs. BMPs bind either ACVR2A/ACVR2B or a BMPR2 and then form a complex with ACVR1. These go on to recruit the R-SMADs SMAD1, SMAD2, SMAD3 or SMAD6.

Clinical significance 

Gain-of-function mutations in the gene ACVR1/ALK2 is responsible for the genetic disease fibrodysplasia ossificans progressiva. The typical FOP patient has the amino acid arginine substituted for the amino acid histidine at position 206 in this protein. This causes a change in the critical glycine-serine activation domain of the protein which will cause the protein to bind its inhibitory ligand (FKBP12) less tightly, and thus over-activate the BMP/SMAD pathway. The result of this over-activation is that endothelial cells transform to mesenchymal stem cells and then to bone. Atypical mutations involving other residues work similarly - causing the protein to be stuck in its active conformation despite no BMP being present.

Mutations in the ACVR1 gene have also been linked to cancer, especially diffuse intrinsic pontine glioma (DIPG).

References

External links
 
 

GS domain
TS domain
S/T domain
Human proteins
EC 2.7.11